CHNT-FM is a First Nations community radio station that operates at 92.3 MHz (FM) on the Timiskaming First Nation near Notre-Dame-du-Nord, Quebec, Canada.

The station is operated by Timiskaming First Nation/Economic Development.CHNT-FM operates at low-power with 50 watts.

External links

Radio stations in Abitibi-Témiscamingue
First Nations radio stations in Quebec
French-language radio stations in Quebec
Year of establishment missing